TW Piscis Austrini (also Fomalhaut B) is a dwarf star in the constellation Piscis Austrinus. It lies relatively close to the Sun, at an estimated distance of 24.8 light-years.
To an observer on Earth the star is visually separated from its larger companion Fomalhaut A by 2 degrees—the width of four full moons.

The TW in the name is a variable star designation. This is a variable star of the type known as a BY Draconis variable, with surface brightness variations causing the changes as the star rotates. It varies slightly in apparent magnitude, ranging from 6.44 to 6.51 over a 10.3-day period.

TW Piscis Austrini lies within a light-year of Fomalhaut A. Due to sharing the same proper motion, and the same estimated age of approximately 440 ± 40 million years, astronomers now consider them to be elements of a multiple star system. A third star, dimmer and more widely separated, Fomalhaut C, gives the system the widest visual separation, to observers from Earth, at approximately 6 degrees. 

In 2019, an exoplanet candidate around Fomalhaut B was detected by astrometry.

References

External links
 TW Piscis Austrini at SolStation.

Piscis Austrinus
K-type main-sequence stars
BY Draconis variables
Piscis Austrini, TW
216803
113283
8721
0879
Durchmusterung objects